The Alor Gajah Square or Keris Square is a town square in Alor Gajah Town, Alor Gajah, Melaka, Malaysia.

Architecture
The square features the Kris Landmark, a large bronze sculpture of a kris.

See also
 List of tourist attractions in Melaka

References

Squares in Malacca